Ali Pasha Castle is a castle in Albania. It is named after Ali Pasha of Tepelenë who resided there until 1820. The current fortress was rebuilt in 1819 from its surface with 3 towers. Until 1820 it was the second residence of Ali Pashe Tepelena.

History
Built under Venetian dominion in the late 15th or early 16th century, it provided a stronghold for the Venetians on Corfu to exploit fishing, grazing, olives and timber in and around Butrint. The castle was the centrepiece of numerous conflicts with the burgeoning Ottoman Empire, and changed hands on several occasions. It was destroyed by a retreating French army in 1798 to prevent it falling into the hands of Ali Pasha.

The fortification attributed to Ali Pasha at Butrint lies some  due west at the mouth of the Vivari Channel. This in itself began life in the late 17th or early 18th century as a fortified estate centre belonging to a Corfiote family that farmed land on the plains south of the ancient city. Ali Pasha seized control of the structure around 1804 and carried out a series of defensive improvements including the installation of gun batteries. Given its small size it is unlikely that the fort functioned as anything more than a control over access from the sea to Butrint, and it can not be compared to Ali's more redoubtable fortresses in the region at Tepelena, Gjirokastra and Ioannina.

See also 

 Castles in Albania 
 Architecture of Albania

References 

Castles in Albania
Tourist attractions in Albania
18th-century fortifications
Vlorë County
Tourist attractions in Vlorë County
Buildings and structures in Sarandë
Ottoman fortifications
Ali Pasha of Ioannina
Butrint National Park